Aganippe Fossa is a surface feature on Mars which runs from 4.1° to 13° south latitude and 124.9° to 126.9° west longitude. It is named after a classical albedo feature.  It is found in the Phoenicis Lacus quadrangle.

Figure 1 shows dark streaks on the slopes of Aganippe Fossa. Such streaks are common on Mars. They occur on steep slopes of craters, troughs, and valleys. The streaks are dark at first. They get lighter with age. Sometimes they start in a tiny spot, then spread out and go for hundreds of meters. They have been seen to travel around obstacles, like boulders. It is believed that they are avalanches of bright dust that expose a darker underlying layer. However, several ideas have been advanced to explain them. Some involve water or even the growth of organisms. The streaks appear in areas covered with dust. Much of the Martian surface is covered with dust. Fine dust settles out of the atmosphere covering everything.

See also

 Dark slope streaks
 Fossa (geology)
 Geology of Mars

References 

Valleys and canyons on Mars
Phoenicis Lacus quadrangle